ORMDL sphingolipid biosynthesis regulator 1 is a protein that in humans is encoded by the ORMDL1 gene.

References

Further reading